Piao may refer to:

People
Piáo (朴), Mandarin pronunciation and pinyin transcription of ethnic Korean surname Park (Korean surname)
Piao Wenyao (born 1988), Chinese professional Go player
Piao Cheng (born 1989), Korean-Chinese football player

Places
Chalan Piao, village on the southwestern area of Saipan 
Gurdwara Nank Piao

Other
Piao (album) (飘 floating), by Zhao Wei
Sang piao xiao  Mantis ootheca
Piao-2 drifting mine

See also
Biao (disambiguation)
Pyu (disambiguation)